Noël Roquevert (born Noël Louis Raymond Bénévent; 18 December 1892 – 6 November 1973) was a French stage and film actor. He appeared in more than 180 films between 1932 and 1972. Roquevert was born in Doué-la-Fontaine and was married to stage and film actress Paulette Noizeux. He died in Douarnenez, France, aged 80.

Partial filmography

 Miarka (1937)
 Barnabé (1938)
 Three Waltzes (1938)
 Thérèse Martin (1939)
 The Porter from Maxim's (1939)
 Paris-New York (1940)
 Sing Anyway (1940)
 The Blue Veil (1942)
 The Trump Card (1942)
 La Main du diable (1943)
 Le Corbeau (1943)
 Pierre and Jean (1943)
 The Last Penny (1946)
 The Sea Rose (1946)
 Song of the Clouds (1946)
 The Lost Village (1947)
 Destiny Has Fun (1947)
 Antoine and Antoinette (1947)
 Dernier refuge (1947)
 Croisière pour l'inconnu (1948)
 Return to Life (1949)
 Cage of Girls (1949)
 Night Round (1949)
 Du Guesclin (1949)
 Justice Is Done (1950)
 Beware of Blondes (1950)
 Adémaï au poteau-frontière (1950)
 Le Sabre de mon père (1951)
 Un amour de parapluie (1951)
 The Dream of Andalusia (1951)
 The Passerby (1951)
 No Vacation for Mr. Mayor (1951)
 My Wife Is Formidable (1951)
 Rome-Paris-Rome (1951)
 The Agony of the Eagles (1952)
 Fanfan la Tulipe (1952)
 Crazy for Love (1952)
 Crimson Curtain (1952)
 She and Me (1952)
 Les Compagnes de la nuit (1953)
 Dortoir des grandes (1953)
 Capitaine Pantoufle (1953)
 My Brother from Senegal (1953)
 The Count of Monte Cristo (1954)
 The Secret of Helene Marimon (1954)
 Madame du Barry (1954)
 Cadet Rousselle (1954)
 The Sheep Has Five Legs (1954)
 It's the Paris Life (1954)
 L'impossible Monsieur Pipelet (1955)
 Black Dossier (1955)
 Madelon (1955)
 Les Diaboliques (1955)
 Napoléon (1955)
 Women's Club (1956)
 The Terror with Women (1956)
 La Bande à papa (1956)
 The Whole Town Accuses (1956)
 Mademoiselle and Her Gang (1957)
 Let's Be Daring, Madame (1957)
 A Night at the Moulin Rouge (1957)
 The Law Is the Law (1958)
 It's All Adam's Fault (1958)
 Archimède le clochard (1959)
 Marie of the Isles (1959)
 Nathalie, Secret Agent (1959)
 Certains l'aiment froide (1960)
 The Girls of La Rochelle (1962)
 How to Succeed in Love (1962)
 Cartouche (1962)
 The Mysteries of Paris (1962)
 Three Girls in Paris (1963)
 Les Veinards (1963)
 The Bamboo Stroke (1963)
 Le Diable et les Dix Commandements (1963)
 L'honorable Stanislas, agent secret (1963)
 À toi de faire... mignonne (1963)
 That Tender Age (1964)
 Marvelous Angelique (1965)
 Line of Demarcation (1966)
 Le Grand Restaurant (1966)
 The Gardener of Argenteuil (1966)
 Quentin Durward (1970, TV series)

References

External links

Noël Roquevert website

1892 births
1973 deaths
French male stage actors
French male film actors
French male silent film actors
People from Maine-et-Loire
20th-century French male actors